Leukoma is a genus of saltwater clams, marine bivalve molluscs in the family Veneridae, the Venus clams. This genus of bivalves has been exploited by humans since prehistory; for example, the Chumash peoples of California harvested this genus from Morro Bay in approximately 1000 AD.

Species
The following species are recognised in the genus Leukoma:
 

Leukoma asperrima 
Leukoma beili 
Leukoma columbiensis 
Leukoma crassicosta 
Leukoma decussata 
Leukoma ecuadoriana 
Leukoma euglypta 
Leukoma granulata 
Leukoma grata 
Leukoma histrionica 
Leukoma jedoensis 
Leukoma laciniata 
Leukoma lima 
Leukoma metodon 
Leukoma pectorina 
Leukoma pertincta 
Leukoma restorationensis 
Leukoma staminea 
Leukoma subrostrata 
Leukoma sugillata 
Leukoma thaca

References

External links
 

Veneridae
Bivalve genera